Gabriela Teresa Cwojdzińska ( Goślińska, 21 February 1928 – 5 November 2022) was a Polish pianist and politician. A member of the Solidarity Citizens' Committee and the Democratic Union, she served in the Senate from 1989 to 1991.

Cwojdzińska died in Koszalin on 5 November 2022, at the age of 94.

References

1928 births
2022 deaths
Polish pianists
Democratic Union (Poland) politicians
Members of the Senate of Poland 1989–1991
Recipients of Cross of Freedom and Solidarity
Alumni of the Academy of Music in Kraków
Musicians from Poznań